The sixth and originally final season of the British-American animated television sitcom The Amazing World of Gumball, created by Ben Bocquelet, premiered on Cartoon Network in the United States on January 5, 2018, and was produced by Cartoon Network Development Studio Europe. The series focuses on the misadventures of Gumball Watterson, a blue 12-year-old cat, along with his adopted brother, Darwin, a goldfish. Together, they cause mischief among their family, as well as with the wide array of students at Elmore Junior High, where they attend middle school. Unlike the previous seasons of the show, this season has 44 episodes, making it the longest season of the series. This season also contains the show's 200th episode "The Vegging", which was led into by a three-day long marathon of the series from January 13 to 15, 2018.

Development

Production
On June 22, 2016, Cartoon Network renewed the series for a sixth season. 

This is the final season where Donielle T. Hansley Jr. voices Darwin. He voices Darwin until Christian J. Simon takes the role in "The Anybody" onward when Darwin clears his throat.

This is Shane Rimmer (voice of Louie) and Gillian Hanna's (voice of Betty) final acting roles before their deaths on March 29th, 2019 and August 18th, 2019, respectively.

The writers for the season were Ben Bocquelet, James Hamilton, Joe Markham, Joe Parham, Jon Purkis, Tobi Wilson, Jack Bernhardt,  Andrew Jones, Ciaran Murtagh, Tom Neenan, Cariad Lloyd, Tom Neenan, Jess Ransom, Mic Graves, Jess Ransom, Eddie Robson, Natasha Hodgson, Gemma Arrowsmith, Sophie Duker, Lucien Young, Tony Hull, Richard Overall, and Paul Rice. The storyboard artists for the season were Adrian Maganza, Chloé Nicolay, Richard Méril, Wandrille Maunoury, Max Loubaresse, Bianca Ansems, Zhihuang Dong, Ben Marsaud, and Oliver Hamilton.

The sixth season production began on July 13, 2017 and ended on October 24, 2018.

On October 7, 2018, series creator Ben Bocquelet retweeted a tweet with an article saying that the sixth season may be the final season, but the author of that article made a follow-up article clarifying that there could still be more seasons.

Episodes

Notes

References

2018 American television seasons
2018 British television seasons
2019 American television seasons
2019 British television seasons
6